Angelo Vicardi (9 October 1936 – 1 January 2006) was an Italian gymnast. He won the bronze medal in the team final at the 1960 Summer Olympics.

References

External links
 
 
 

1937 births
2006 deaths
People from Melegnano
Italian male artistic gymnasts
Gymnasts at the 1960 Summer Olympics
Gymnasts at the 1964 Summer Olympics
Gymnasts at the 1968 Summer Olympics
Olympic gymnasts of Italy
Olympic bronze medalists for Italy
Olympic medalists in gymnastics
Medalists at the 1960 Summer Olympics
Sportspeople from the Metropolitan City of Milan